MCMT may refer to:
DNMT1, a human gene
Methylcyclopentadienyl manganese tricarbonyl, a gasoline additive to increase the fuel's octane rating.